Paralophia is a scientific name for two genera of organisms and may refer to:
 Paralophia (moth),  a genus of moth in the family Geometridae
 Paralophia (plant), a plant genus in the family Orchidaceae